Portland, Oregon, in the United States, is known for having an established coffee culture. In February 2012, The New York Times reported that Portland had more than 30 coffee roasters. Comparing Portland's coffee culture to other major cities along the West Coast, Oliver Strand wrote: "Seattle coffee might have more muscle, and San Francisco coffee might have more mystique, but Portland's coffee scene is arguably the country's most intimate. It's also one of the most relaxed."

Portland is noted as a place in which people use coffeehouses as a third place. There is more coffee available in gentrified areas of Portland.

Coffeehouses and roasters
Coffeehouses have included Coffee Time, Prince Coffee, Public Domain Coffee, Rimsky-Korsakoffee House, Southeast Grind (2009–2019), and Spella Caffè. Some of Portland's roasters include Case Study Coffee Roasters, Coava Coffee Roasters, Deadstock Coffee, Heart Coffee Roasters, Nossa Familia Coffee, Water Avenue Coffee, Sterling Coffee Roasters and Stumptown Coffee Roasters.

In 2020, former Boston Red Sox player Kevin Youkilis opened his Loma Coffee Company roastery. Their Ethiopian coffee has been awarded the Good Food Award.

Events
In 2012, the Specialty Coffee Association of America hosted its annual convention, billed as "the largest coffee industry gathering in the world", at the Oregon Convention Center.

See also

 Coffee in Seattle

References

Further reading

External links
Here is a List of Every Coffee Roaster in Portland (We Think), Willamette Week (2012)
10 things to consider when going off the grid Sprudge, a Portland coffee blog

Coffee culture in the United States
 
Culture of Portland, Oregon